Oakland is a town in and the county seat of Garrett County, Maryland, United States. The population was 1,851 at the 2020 census. It is situated only miles from the source of the Potomac River, which flows directly into Chesapeake Bay. It is also near the Wisp Resort at Deep Creek Lake, a major ski resort for many Marylanders and other visitors. Oakland is part of the Pittsburgh DMA.

History

Oakland was formally incorporated as a town in 1862.

The town is home to a historic B&O railroad station, which was listed on the National Register of Historic Places in 1973, and restored in the 2000s. Trains still run on the rail tracks behind the station, but it is mainly used for special organizations or gatherings at present. A gift shop is located within the station. In front of the station, there are a plethora of festivities that go on, mainly seasonal activities such as housing the town Christmas tree, decorating the plaza for a holiday, and sometimes parties.

Main Street of Oakland consists mainly of historic two to four story edifices that house the main shopping facilities in the area, such as a theatre, museum, book store, a local pharmacy, antique shops, clothing stores and banks. Many of the homes and businesses in the downtown area are examples of Victorian architecture. Much of the central section of Oakland is part of the Oakland Historic District, listed on the National Register of Historic Places in 1984. Also listed on the National Register are the Garrett County Courthouse and Hoye Site.

One of the most prominent and historic churches in Oakland is St. Matthew's Episcopal Church, where U.S. Presidents Ulysses S. Grant, James Garfield, Grover Cleveland, and Benjamin Harrison have all attended services. Because of this, it is now called the "Church of Presidents." Another prominent and historic church is St. Peter the Apostle Church, a Catholic church located on Fourth Street.  A large neoclassical courthouse is also very prominent and dominates the town center.

In the late 19th century and early 20th century, a large hotel named the Oakland Hotel was located near the downtown railroad station. It was constructed in 1878 by the B&O Railroad. The hotel was a major tourist attraction for that time period until it was torn down in the early 20th century.

Geography
Oakland is in the south-central to western portion of Garrett County, located at  (39.410480, −79.404380). It is set in a small valley. It is only 6.61 miles from Second Street to Deep Creek Lake.

Climate
The average first and last dates for freezing temperatures are September 28 and May 15, respectively; for measurable (≥) snowfall, they are November 13 and April 7.

Demographics

2010 census
As of the census of 2010, there were 1,925 persons, 875 households, and 470 families living in the town. The racial makeup of the town was 98.0% White, 0.2% African American, 0.3% Native American, 0.6% Asian, 0.1% from other races, and 0.9% from two or more races. Hispanic or Latino of any race were 0.7% of the population.

There were 875 households, of which 23.1% had children under the age of 18 living with them, 40.1% were married couples living together, 10.5% had a female householder with no husband present, 3.1% had a male householder with no wife present, and 46.3% were non-families. 40.5% of all households were made up of individuals, and 16.6% had someone living alone who was 65 years of age or older. The average household size was 2.03 and the average family size was 2.73.

The median age in the town was 46.9 years. 17.5% of residents were under the age of 18; 7.3% were between the ages of 18 and 24; 22.6% were from 25 to 44; 30.2% were from 45 to 64; and 22.5% were 65 years of age or older. The gender makeup of the town was 47.7% male and 52.3% female.

2000 census
As of the census of 2000, there were 1,930 persons, 787 households, and 447 families living in the town. The racial makeup of the town was 98.13% White, 0.73% African American, 0.16% Native American, 0.57% Asian, 0.16% from other races, and 0.26% from two or more races. Hispanic or Latino of any race were 0.78% of the population. 33% of Oakland's residents were of German descent, 11% English, 11% Irish, 6% Italian, 2% Dutch, 2% French, 2% Polish, 2% Scottish, 2% Scotch-Irish and 2% Swedish. People of Swiss, British, Welsh and Hungarian descent each comprised 1% of the population.

There were 787 households, out of which 25.3% had children under the age of 18 living with them, 43.6% were married couples living together, 9.8% had a female householder with no husband present, and 43.1% were non-families. 38.8% of all households were made up of individuals, and 18.7% had someone living alone who was 65 years of age or older. The average household size was 2.09 and the average family size was 2.75.

In the town, the population was spread out, with 18.5% under the age of 18, 9.4% from 18 to 24, 24.0% from 25 to 44, 23.2% from 45 to 64, and 24.9% who were 65 years of age or older. The median age was 43 years. For every 100 females, there were 85.8 males. For every 100 females age 18 and over, there were 84.2 males.

The median income for a household in the town was $26,728, and the median income for a family was $38,750. Males had a median income of $29,625 versus $21,542 for females. The per capita income for the town was $16,872. About 13.3% of families and 19.0% of the population were below the poverty line, including 21.9% of those under age 18 and 21.0% of those age 65 or over.

The Oakland area is home to an Amish community that consists of a church district of about 70 homes. The Amish community dates back to 1850 and became associated with the New Order Amish, with electricity permitted inside of homes. The Amish community in Oakland has a small number of converts to the Amish faith, a rarity in the Amish world. There are only between 150 and 200 Amish converts in the United States out of a population around 200,000. The Lancaster County, Pennsylvania Amish have had only one successful convert in over 100 years.

Transportation

Several state-maintained highways serve Oakland. The most prominent of these is U.S. Route 219, which follows Garrett Highway, Oak Street and Third Street through the town. To the north, US 219 connects to Maryland Route 42, Interstate 68 and U.S. Route 40, along with the towns of Accident and Grantsville, before passing into Pennsylvania. Heading south, US 219 briefly passes through Mountain Lake Park and connects with U.S. Route 50 before entering West Virginia. Two other state highways, Maryland Route 39 and Maryland Route 135 also serve Oakland. MD 39 heads northwest to West Virginia, while MD 135 heads east, connecting to Maryland Route 560, Maryland Route 38 and Maryland Route 495, as well as the towns of Mountain Lake Park and Deer Park, before entering Allegany County near the town of Luke.

Attractions and events 

The Oakland post office is home to a Depression-era mural, Buckwheat Harvest, painted by American artist Robert Franklin Gates. Gates was funded by the Treasury Section of Fine Arts to complete the mural as part of President Franklin Roosevelt's New Deal. Gates was probably inspired by Garrett County's strong tradition of growing buckwheat.

Oakland is home to the Oakland B&O Museum and the Garrett County Museum of Transportation.

Notable people
 Maurice Brookhart, William R. Kenan, Jr. Professor of Chemistry in the Department of Chemistry at the University of North Carolina. A member of the National Academy of Sciences, Brookhart was born and raised in Oakland.
 Darvin Moon, runner-up at the 2009 World Series of Poker Main Event.

References

External links

 

 
1862 establishments in Maryland
Amish in Maryland
County seats in Maryland
Populated places established in 1862
Towns in Garrett County, Maryland
Towns in Maryland